Arasada is a genus of moths of the family Noctuidae. The genus was erected by Frederic Moore in 1885.

Species
Arasada albicosta Hampson, 1894
Arasada javanica Hampson, 1910
Arasada kanshireiensis Wileman, 1916
Arasada ornata Wileman, 1911
Arasada pyraliformis Moore, [1885]

References

Acontiinae